The A2 motorway in Cyprus is a road which branches off the A1 at Pera Chorio-Nisou and connects to the A3. It is referred to locally as the Nicosia - Larnaca motorway. It is also called "the tube" because it is mostly straight with a very limited number of exits. Two of its 6 junctions are limited access to facilitate access to Athienou.

At the Rizoelia Junction, space has been made to construct a flyover from the A2 to the BS, as seen on Google maps.

See also 
 A1 motorway (Cyprus)
 A3 motorway (Cyprus)
 A4 motorway (Cyprus)
 A6 motorway (Cyprus)
 A7 motorway (Cyprus)
 A9 motorway (Cyprus)
 A22 motorway (Cyprus)

References 

Motorways and roads in Cyprus